Intractable may refer to:

 Intractable conflict, a form of complex, severe, and enduring conflict
 Intractable pain, pain which cannot be controlled/cured by any known treatment
 Intractability (complexity), in computational complexity theory